Arnaud Casquette (born 16 April 1978) is a Mauritian long jumper.

He finished seventh at the 2002 Commonwealth Games and fifth at the 2006 African Championships. He won the silver medal at the 2007 All-Africa Games. He also competed at the IAAF World Championships in 2001 and 2007 as well as the Olympic Games in 1996 and 2000. He was qualified for the 2008 Olympics, but did not compete because of injury.

Casquette is considered one of the greatest high level sportsman that Mauritius has ever produced thanks to his successful competitive streak at the international level. He has participated in many international athletics competitions around the world and won numerous gold medals for Mauritius. He was trained at the HPTC (CIAD) in Dakar Senegal from 1999 to 2005 and then joined another high performance training centre in Malaysia for a few years before ending his career due to injury.

In 2001, he reached the World Championships semi-finals of the  4x100m relay in Edmonton, Canada and he currently holds the Mauritian record in the 4x100m relay with a time of 38.99 seconds, together with Stephan Buckland, Eric Milazar and Fernando Augustin. He also won a gold medal at the Francophone Games in Ottawa, Canada in the 4x100m relay event with Buckland, Milazar and Augustin. He was the former record holder in the long jump event for Mauritius. His personal best jump is 8.23 metres, achieved in July 2003 in Sestriere. The Mauritian record is currently held by Jonathan Chimier with 8.28 metres.

Achievements

References

External links
 

1978 births
Living people
Mauritian male long jumpers
Mauritian male sprinters
Athletes (track and field) at the 1996 Summer Olympics
Athletes (track and field) at the 2000 Summer Olympics
Olympic athletes of Mauritius
Doping cases in athletics
Mauritian sportspeople in doping cases
Commonwealth Games competitors for Mauritius
Athletes (track and field) at the 2002 Commonwealth Games
African Games silver medalists for Mauritius
African Games medalists in athletics (track and field)
Athletes (track and field) at the 2007 All-Africa Games